Jessica Moore and Storm Sanders were the defending champions, but both players chose to participate with different partners. Sanders played alongside Gabriella Da Silva-Fick, but lost in the first round to Destanee Aiava and Alicia Smith. Moore played alongside Ellen Perez, however they lost in the final to Asia Muhammad and Arina Rodionova, 6–4, 6–4.

Seeds

Draw

References
Main Draw

Canberra Tennis International - Doubles
2017 in Australian tennis
2017